Casa Batalha is a traditional jewellery, the family business founded in 1635 and today the oldest brand in Portugal.

The founder João Cipriano Rodrigues Batalha started with the selling of bijouterie and embroidery.

See also 
List of oldest companies

References

External links 

Jewellery companies of Portugal
Companies established in the 17th century
17th-century establishments in Portugal
Portuguese brands